Adelinde Cornelissen (born July 8, 1979, in Beilen, Drenthe) is a Dutch dressage rider.

Biography
As a junior, Cornelissen won three national Dutch titles; twice with Ayesha and once with Mr. Pride. In 2004, she won her first senior title at national level when she won the Z2-class with Parzival. In that same year she became national champion in the Reserve Championships in the ZZ-light-class with, followed by the same title in the ZZ-heavy-class title in 2005, both times on Parzival. In 2007, she and Parzival won the Dutch national championship in the heavy-class and she won two silver medals, at International Grand Prix meetings in Falsterbo and Herentals. In Falsterbo she finished second in the Grand Prix Spécial, while in she won the GPS in Herentals. During the Grand Prix in Rotterdam she and her teammates won the gold medal in the Nations competition, she came third in the Grand Prix Spécial. She won another GPS bronze medal in Arnhem.

In 2008, she became the champion in the Reserve Championships again, this time in the ZZ-heavy-class. She also became national champion at the Dutch Championships that year. Cornelissen and Parzival went on to win the International Grand Prix of Indoor Brabant, while they became second in the Grand Prix Spécial. At the Grand Prix meeting in Aachen, they became second in both the Grand Prix as well as the GPS.

Cornelissen was selected to represent the Netherlands at the 2008 Summer Olympics in Beijing as a reserve. The original team consisted of Anky van Grunsven, Imke Bartels and Hans Peter Minderhoud.

At the 2009 European Dressage Championship she won with Parzival team and individual (Grand Prix Spécial) gold and in the Grand Prix Freestyle she won the silver medal. At the 2010 FEI World Equestrian Games Cornelissen was eliminated in the Grand Prix due to blood being visible in Parzival's mouth as a result of Parzival having bitten his tongue.

In 2011 Adelinde Cornelissen won the Dressage World Cup Final in Leipzig with Parzival''. At the 2011 European Dressage Championship in Rotterdam she won both individual gold medals Parzival, the Dutch team won the bronze medal. In 2012, she won the bronze medal in the team event at the Olympic Games and the silver medal in the individual dressage on Parzival. The day after Adelinde won the individual silver medal and upon being questioned by the BBC Breakfast presenter Bill Turnbull why Adelinde Cornelissen hadn't won the gold the president of the dressage ground jury, Stephen Clarke, stated that her horse had had a case of crossing jaws.

At the 2013 European Dressage Championships she won team silver and two bronze medals in individual events.

In the 2016 Summer Olympics in Rio de Janeiro, Cornelissen withdrew from the team dressage competition out of concern for her horse Parzival's health.

International Championship Results

Notable Horses 

 Jerich Parzival - 1997 Chestnut Dutch Warmblood Gelding (Jazz x Ulft)
 2009 European Championships - Team Gold Medal, Individual Gold Medal, Individual Silver Medal Freestyle
 2010 FEI World Cup Final - Silver Medal
 2010 World Equestrian Games - Team Gold Medal
 2011 FEI World Cup Final - Gold Medal
 2011 European Championships - Team Bronze Medal, Individual Gold Medal, Individual Gold Medal Freestyle
 2012 FEI World Cup Final - Gold Medal
 2012 London Olympics - Team Bronze Medal, Individual Silver Medal
 2013 FEI World Cup Final - Silver Medal
 2013 European Championships - Team Silver Medal, Individual Bronze Medal, Individual Bronze Medal Freestyle
 2014 World Equestrian Games - Team Bronze Medal, Individual Fourth Place, Individual Bronze Medal Freestyle
 2016 Rio Olympics - Team Fourth Place
 Henike - 2012 Bay Dutch Warmblood Stallion (Alexandro P x Upperville)
 2017 FEI Dressage Young Horse World Championships - Sixth Place
 Fleau de Baian - 2010 Chestnut Dutch Warmblood Stallion (Jazz)
 2017 FEI Dressage Young Horse World Championships - Seventh Place
 Governor STR - 2011 Black Dutch Warmblood Stallion (Totilas x Jazz)
 2017 FEI Dressage Young Horse World Championships - Silver Medal

References

External links 
  
 
 

1979 births
Living people
People from Midden-Drenthe
Dutch dressage riders
Olympic equestrians of the Netherlands
Dutch female equestrians
Equestrians at the 2008 Summer Olympics
Equestrians at the 2012 Summer Olympics
Equestrians at the 2016 Summer Olympics
Olympic silver medalists for the Netherlands
Olympic bronze medalists for the Netherlands
Olympic medalists in equestrian
Medalists at the 2012 Summer Olympics
Sportspeople from Drenthe
21st-century Dutch women